The Stanovoy Highlands or Stanovoy Uplands is a mountain range in the Transbaikal region of Siberia, Russia.

Geography
The Stanovoy Highlands are a mountainous area between the Patom Highlands to the north and the Vitim Plateau to the south. To the northeast they border with the Olyokma-Chara Plateau —in the upper reaches of the Chara river. The ranges of the highlands stretch roughly in a WSW / ENE direction between the North Baikal Highlands in the west and the Olyokma River in the east.

Subranges
The system of the Stanovoy Highlands comprises a group of subranges, including the following:

Southern Muya Range (Южно-Муйский хребет), highest point  Muisky Gigant, 
Northern Muya Range (Северо-Муйский хребет), highest point  
Kodar Range (Кодар), highest point Pik BAM, 
Udokan Range (Удокан), highest point   
Kalar Range, highest point Skalisty Golets, 
Delyun-Uran Range (Делюн-Уранский Хребет), highest point

Hydrography
The Stanovoy mountain system is cut across from south to north by the deep valley of river Vitim, a right tributary of the Lena. Many left (Muya, Mamakan, Mama, Bolshoy Chuya) and right (Kalakan, Kalar, Konda, Sigikta) tributaries of the Vitim originate from its ranges. Likewise for some of the left tributaries of the Olyokma, such as the Diri-Yurya, Imangra, Khani, Oryus-Miele and the Chara with the Tokko. 

Rivers Upper Angara, flowing into Lake Baikal, and Chaya, a right tributary of the Lena, have their sources in the western parts of the mountain system. There are also mountain lakes in the range, such as Dorong.

See also
List of mountains and hills of Russia

References

External links